James Allen Clarke (born 1985), better known as Jodie Harsh, is a London-based DJ music producer, promoter, and drag queen.

Born in Canterbury, Kent in 1985, Harsh attended the London College of Fashion. While at university, she first adopted the persona of Jodie Harsh to make money through nightclub jobs.

In April 2016, it was announced that Harsh has filmed scenes for Absolutely Fabulous: The Movie, a film adaptation of the cult British television series; the film was released in July 2016. Jodie played herself in the movie, which also stars Jennifer Saunders, Joanna Lumley, and supermodel Kate Moss.

In 2019, Out described Harsh as "Britain's Best-Known Drag Queen". In 2021, Harsh made a guest appearance on the third episode of the second series of RuPaul's Drag Race UK on BBC Three.

Discography

Extended plays

Singles

References

External links 
 

Club DJs
English drag queens
English LGBT musicians
1985 births
British DJs
Living people
People from Canterbury
Musicians from Kent
Electronic dance music DJs